Uzunçam can refer to:

 Uzunçam, Mudurnu
 Uzunçam, Nazilli